Dawson-Bryant High School is a public high school in Coal Grove, Ohio.  It is the only high school in the Dawson-Bryant Local School District.  Their mascot is the Hornets; and the school's colors are red, black, and white.

Athletics
Dawson-Bryant High School is a founding member of the Ohio Valley Conference. Currently, the other members of the conference include Chesapeake High School (Panthers), Rock Hill Senior High School (Redmen), Proctorville Fairland High School (Dragons), South Point High School (Pointers), Ironton High School (Fighting Tigers), Portsmouth High School (Trojans) and Gallia Academy High School (Blue Devils)

Powerlifting
2006, 2007, 2009, and 2010 state champions

OMEA Superior Ratings 
2015, 2016, 2019, and 2022

References

External links
 

High schools in Lawrence County, Ohio
Public high schools in Ohio